Nick Dunning (born 1957 in London) is an English actor.
He is a well known theatre actor who attended RADA (Dip Hons) 1977, where he won the Ronson Prize for Most Promising Young Actor. He has appeared on stage in the West End in London and at the Gate Theatre in Dublin. He has won two Irish Times Theatre Awards. He has worked with the Royal Shakespeare Company, the Royal National Theatre and the Royal Court Theatre. To date, he is best known for his role as Thomas Boleyn in The Tudors, a Showtime original series, for which he won an IFTA award for Best Supporting Actor. He has also appeared in numerous popular British TV shows such as Waking the Dead, Kavanagh QC, and the Midsomer Murders episode Death's Shadow. Coronation Street. He is currently starring in a production of Dangerous Liaisons at the Gate Theatre.

Dunning was head of development at the now defunct website www.screenwritingonthenet.com. He wrote two books on screenwriting. He also wrote the screenplay for The Lorelei, directed by Terry Johnson, BBC Screen Two. He has developed several works for TV. He is currently writing a play with the Gate Theatre and developing a screenplay with a freelance TV and film director.

Dunning attended a private school in London and a comprehensive school in Leicester. He actually went to Coppets Wood Primary School in North London, before going to Woodhouse Grammar in North Finchley in 1968,
and from there, moved to Minchenden School in Southgate in about 1970.

Dunning has been married to Lise-Anne McLaughlin since 1992. Their children are Kitty and Phoebe. He lives in Dalkey, Dublin.

Selected filmography
Quirke (2014)
Da Vinci's Demons (2013-2015) - Lupo Mercuri
Hatfields & McCoys (2012) - Reverend Garrett
Injustice (2011)
The Iron Lady (2011)
Fifty Dead Men Walking (2007)
My Boy Jack (2007)
The Tudors (2007) - Thomas Boleyn, 1st Earl of Wiltshire
Malice Aforethought (2005)
Alexander (2004) - Attalus
The Account (2004)
The Return (2003)
 The Firm (1989)

References

External links

1959 births
Male actors from London
Alumni of RADA
Living people
English expatriates in Ireland
English male stage actors
English male television actors